Riot Live is the first official extended play live recording by New York City heavy metal band Riot. Released in 1982, it followed on the heels of Restless Breed, the group's first studio album with vocalist Rhett Forrester. It was issued with different cover artwork in Europe.

While never made available on CD as a stand-alone release, the EP was included as bonus tracks on the 1997 Restless Breed CD re-issue by German label High Vaultage. However, the 6 songs were left off the original 1999 U.S. Restless Breed re-issue on Metal Blade Records but were eventually included on the 2016 re-issue, also released by Metal Blade.

Track listing

Personnel
Rhett Forrester - vocals
Mark Reale - guitars
Rick Ventura - guitars
Kip Leming - bass
Sandy Slavin - drums

References

Riot V albums
1982 EPs
1982 live albums
Live EPs
Elektra Records EPs